László Bölöni (born 11 March 1953) is a Romanian professional football manager and former player who is the manager of Ligue 2 club Metz.

After starting out at ASA Târgu Mureș, Bölöni became an integral part of the Steaua București team that won the European Cup in 1986, making it the only Romanian team—and one of two Eastern European sides—to have achieved the honour. He was twice named Romanian Footballer of the Year and took part in 484 Divizia A games, the fourth-most appearances in the history of the competition. Internationally, Bölöni earned 102 caps with the national team, which ranks him fifth in the nation's all-time list, and scored 23 goals, the sixth highest all-time mark. He is thus considered one of the best Romanian footballers in history.

Following his retirement as a player he went on to coach clubs in France, Portugal, the Arabian Peninsula, Belgium and Greece. Bölöni was also at the helm of the Romania national team between 2000 and 2001. In terms of trophies won, his most successful stints were at Sporting CP and Standard Liège with three domestic honours each.

Club career

Bölöni was born in Târgu Mureș, Romania, into an ethnic Hungarian family from Târnăveni. His first team was Chimica Târnăveni, and in 1970 he moved to ASA Târgu Mureș. He stayed there until 1984, when he joined Steaua București, where he was part of the team which won the 1986 European Cup Final (where he missed his penalty in the shootout) and the European Super Cup the following year.

Bölöni remained at Steaua until 1987. In 1988, aged 35, Bölöni left the country to play in Belgium at Racing Jet Bruxelles and then in France at US Créteil. He retired from professional football in 1992. On 25 March 2008, he was decorated by Romanian president Traian Băsescu with Ordinul "Meritul Sportiv" — (The Order "The Sportive Merit") class II, for his part in winning the European Cup in 1986.

International career
Bölöni won the Universiade gold medal with Romania's students football team in the 1974 edition that was held in France, playing alongside Gheorghe Mulțescu, Dan Păltinișanu, Romulus Chihaia and Paul Cazan.

Playing for the Romania national team in 1983, Bölöni scored one of his most notable goals, in the 1–0 win against Italy in a Euro 84 qualification match, which eventually proved invaluable to the country's qualification for the tournament. At the finals themselves in France, he played in all three of Romania's games, and scored the equaliser in the 1–1 draw with Spain at the Stade Geoffroy-Guichard. In total, Bölöni won 102 caps for Romania and scored 23 goals—or 108 caps and 25 goals if the Olympic games qualification is included.

Managerial career
As a football coach, Bölöni started with French club AS Nancy-Lorraine, where he was head coach for several years. He promoted with the team in Ligue 1. In 2000, he was appointed as national team coach, but in the summer of 2001 decided to leave the job.

Then he joined Portugal's club Sporting Clube de Portugal, where he won both the Portuguese championship and cup in his first year. He was fired at the end of the next season due to mediocre results. His legacy at Sporting was the introduction of youth team players such as Ricardo Quaresma, Hugo Viana and Cristiano Ronaldo into the senior's team starting lineup.

In 2003, he returned to France as manager of Stade Rennais; in 2005, he managed the team to their best position in history (4th in Ligue 1), and a subsequent UEFA Cup qualification.

In May 2006, Bölöni signed a two-year contract with AS Monaco but was fired on 23 October for lack of results (Monaco being 19th out of 20 in the league by that date).

On 9 June 2008, Belgian team Standard Liège appointed Bölöni as their new manager, as he succeeded Michel Preud'homme, who led the club to their first Belgian First Division title in 25 years (season 2007–2008). On 24 May 2009, he won the Belgian First Division title in his first season at Standard (season 2008–2009) after playing the championship play-off against Anderlecht.
On 10 February 2010, Bölöni resigned from his coaching position at Standard Liege.

On 29 May 2010, it was officially announced that Bölöni signed a contract with United Arab Emirates side Al-Wahda. On 2 September 2010, Al-Wahda sacked Bölöni, despite the team's 3–1 win over Ittihad Kalba.

On 2 January 2011, he was hired by RC Lens, on a one-year contract, but he couldn't save the team from relegation. 
Bölöni was immediately released in June, and signed a two-year contract with PAOK on 8 June 2011, following a short negotiation period.

PAOK

Bölöni's tenure at PAOK started with two wins against Vålerenga Fotball for the Third Qualifying Round of 2011–12 UEFA Europa League, that brought them against Karpaty Lviv for the Play-off round. PAOK won the first leg at home and drew the second leg, qualifying for the group stage. In a tough group that consisted of Tottenham Hotspur F.C., FC Rubin Kazan and Shamrock Rovers F.C., Bölöni's PAOK managed to qualify undefeated at the first place, winning the game at White Hart Lane on the process, a remarkable feat considering that no Greek team had won at English soil since 1999 when PAOK defeated Arsenal at Highbury. For the round of 32, PAOK faced Udinese Calcio, and although a 0–0 draw at the first game in Italy spread optimism, a weakened PAOK side was eliminated off the competition when the home leg ended with a 0–3 defeat. All and all, the European presence was positive despite the abrupt end, as PAOK managed 6 wins out of 12 games, with impressive performances and a milestone win against Tottenham.

At the home front, PAOK had a turbulent season, as the team managed to finish 3rd in regular season, with 5th being its final position after Play-off. During the season, PAOK won the away games against AEK Athens F.C. and Panathinaikos F.C., marking the end of a winless, 10-year-old tradition against those teams when playing away from home. Team's form was inconsistent though, and the departure – due to the club's financial difficulties – of two of the most significant players of the team, Vieirinha and Pablo Contreras didn't help matters. Bölöni had to improvise to cover for the roster's lack of depth, with mixed results. Although the season was not deemed successful, fans didn't put the blame on Bölöni, who had won their hearts with his personality, his results against some major opponents and the team's style of play when on good form.

On 25 May 2012 PAOK released Bölöni after a one-year cooperation.

Coaching in the Middle East
Bölöni was hired by Qatari club Al Khor on 21 June 2012. On 26 January 2013, in a league match against Qatar SC, he was involved in a controversial incident. He threw a water bottle at a ball boy behind the goal after the boy took the ball, which went out of play, off the pitch. The bottle did not hit the boy, however, it was spotted by the match observer, Ali Al-Naimi, who relayed the information to a referee's assistant who eventually informed the referee, Fahad Jaber, who decided to send him off. Instead of going directly to the stands, he chose to illegally stay within the checkpoint. Security officers attempted to guide him off, but he retorted by using foul language and pushing the police officers. As a result, a police report was filed against him. He was later fined 75,000 Qatari riyals by the QFA and banned for 5 matches.

In August 2013, Croatian media speculated that Bölöni might be named the new head coach of Dinamo Zagreb, following the sacking of team's former head coach, Krunoslav Jurčić. Bölöni has previously been linked with Hajduk Split, Dinamo Zagreb's fierce rival, as well.

On 21 July 2015, Saudi club Al-Ittihad announced Bölöni as their new coach.

Royal Antwerp
On 16 June 2017, Bölöni was announced as the new manager of Belgian club Royal Antwerp. In his first season at the club, he finished 8th place in the regular season, and 3rd place in the Europa League play-off group to keep the team safe from relegation.

In his second season, Antwerp was the surprise package of the championship, finishing the regular season on 6th place, and qualifying for the championship play-offs for the first time. Antwerp recorded important victories over Genk (1–0), Anderlecht (2–1), Gent (2–1), Standard Liège (2–1), as well as a blank draw with Club Brugge in the first half of the play-off, and climbed on the 3rd place, but later losses to these teams meant Antwerp finished 4th, thus going for the Europa League play-offs final. In the final, Antwerp beat Charleroi 3–2 after coming back from 0 to 2 down in the first minutes. Thus, Antwerp secured qualification in the third qualifying round of UEFA Europa League after 26 years of absence from Europe.

After surprisingly knocking out Viktoria Plzeň on away goals in the third round, Antwerp stopped short of the group stages as they were subsequently knocked out by AZ in the play-offs. Internally, Bölöni led the team to another 4th-place finish in the league, as well as the Belgian cup final in the 2019–20 season, their first since 1992. However, the competition was postponed to 1 August due to the COVID-19 pandemic and Bölöni's contract subsequently expired on 20 May, leading his successor Ivan Leko to manage the team for the final.

Gent
On 20 August 2020, Belgian League runners-up K.A.A. Gent announced Bölöni as their new head coach. In September, he was sacked after only three games in charge.

Panathinaikos
On 19 October 2020, Bölöni was announced as the new head coach for Greek club Panathinaikos. He drew his first game 1–1 against Volos in the Super League. On May 10, 2021, Boloni was, for the second time this season, sacked, this time by the Greens after failing to guide them to a European qualification spot; he was replaced by Ivan Jovanović on 24 May.

Throughout January 2022, Bölöni was in talks with Romanian Football Federation president Răzvan Burleanu to return as manager of the Romania national team, more than twenty years after leaving the job. The failed negotiations led to the appointing of Edward Iordănescu instead.

Personal life
When Bölöni was 15, his father died of a stroke while watching him play from the stands. The death of the parent strongly affected him, but Bölöni was persuaded by his mother to continue playing football. She moved from their native city Târnăveni to Budapest sometime later in her life. During his time at Steaua București, Bölöni also professed as a dentist for six years; his daughter followed in his footsteps and studied implantology in France.

When asked why he prefers to be called Hungarian rather than Romanian, Bölöni said: "It's not a matter of preference, I am a Hungarian, period." He also added: "That doesn't prevent me from living in Romania, where I played, including in the national team. Even if I belong to the Hungarian minority, I scored against Hungary, I trained the Romanian team to beat Hungary in the World Cup preliminaries. But I received Hungarian education and culture. Thanks to my parents." In 2019, after anti-Hungarian chants were heard from the stands during the Romanian national team's matches against Spain and Malta, he once again stated: "I am Hungarian", then asked: "what is our fault?" He was both disgusted and disappointed by the actions of the perpetrators.

In 2021, he was hired by the Nemzeti Sport daily to analyze Hungary's matches at the UEFA Euro 2020, and in the same year revealed his support of the Székely Land football team. Nevertheless, after failed negotiations to take charge of the Romania national team in 2022, Bölöni expressed his regret for not being able to represent his country again.

Career statistics

Club

International

Scores and results list Romania's goal tally first, score column indicates score after each Bölöni goal.

Managerial statistics

Honours

Player
Steaua București
Divizia A: 1984–85, 1985–86, 1986–87
Cupa României: 1984–85, 1986–87
European Cup: 1985–86
European Super Cup: 1986
Intercontinental Cup runner-up: 1986

Individual
Romanian Footballer of the Year: 1977, 1983

Manager
Nancy-Lorraine
Ligue 2: 1997–98

Sporting CP
Primeira Liga: 2001–02
Taça de Portugal: 2001–02
Supertaça Cândido de Oliveira: 2002

Al-Jazira
Gulf Club Champions Cup: 2007

Standard Liège
Belgian First Division: 2008–09
Belgian Super Cup: 2008, 2009

Individual
Belgian Manager of the Year: 2009

See also
 List of men's footballers with 100 or more international caps

References

1953 births
Living people
Sportspeople from Târgu Mureș
Romanian footballers
Romania international footballers
Romanian football managers
Romania national football team managers
Romanian sportspeople of Hungarian descent
Association football midfielders
UEFA Euro 1984 players
FIFA Century Club
FC Steaua București players
Racing Jet Wavre players
US Créteil-Lusitanos players
US Orléans players
Liga I players
Liga II players
Belgian Pro League players
Ligue 2 players
Romanian expatriate footballers
Expatriate footballers in Belgium
Expatriate footballers in France
Ligue 1 managers
Primeira Liga managers
Super League Greece managers
AS Nancy Lorraine managers
Sporting CP managers
Stade Rennais F.C. managers
AS Monaco FC managers
Al Jazira Club managers
Standard Liège managers
Al Wahda FC managers
RC Lens managers
PAOK FC managers
Al-Khor SC managers
Royal Antwerp F.C. managers
K.A.A. Gent managers
FC Metz managers
Expatriate football managers in France
Expatriate football managers in Monaco
Expatriate football managers in Portugal
Expatriate football managers in the United Arab Emirates
Expatriate football managers in Belgium
Expatriate football managers in Greece
Expatriate football managers in Qatar
Romanian expatriate sportspeople in Belgium
Romanian expatriate sportspeople in France
Romanian expatriate sportspeople in Monaco
Romanian expatriate sportspeople in Portugal
Romanian expatriate sportspeople in the United Arab Emirates
Romanian expatriate sportspeople in Greece
Romanian expatriate sportspeople in Qatar
Romanian expatriate football managers
ASA Târgu Mureș (1962) players
Ittihad FC managers
Belgian Pro League managers
Expatriate football managers in Saudi Arabia
Romanian expatriate sportspeople in Saudi Arabia